Paolo Rotondo is a New Zealand director, writer and actor of stage and screen.

Biography 
Rontondo was born in Napoli, Italy, from a Neapolitan father and New Zealand mother of Irish descent. He grew up in Italy and moved to New Zealand when he was eleven. 

As an actor, Rotondo is best known for his character Andrew Solomon on the New Zealand soap opera Shortland Street. In 2016 he released his debut feature film "Orphans & Kingdoms" to great critical acclaim. He was a lead in the New Zealand feature film Stickmen. Television roles include on Xena: Warrior Princess, and When We Go to War. He was nominated for TV Guide Best actor' on two occasions. In 2016 Paolo played Johnny Torrio, Al Capone's infamous mentor in the US Television series The Making of the Mob: Chicago.

As a writer Rotondo has written for film and theatre. The short films The Freezer and Dead Letters were both supported by the New Zealand Film Commission and are studied in New Zealand high schools. Plays he has written include  Little Che inspired by The Motorcycle Diaries and Strange Resting Places co-written with Rob Mokaraka, produced by Taki Rua Productions and based on family stories of the Māori Battalion in Italy in World War II. Strange Resting Places was performed for over nine years and been published by Playmarket. It was also the opening feature-length episode of the six-part television series Atamira. It aired on Māori TV on 25 April 2012 at 8.30pm.

As a TV Commercial Director Paolo is represented by Flying Fish films New Zealand. He directed the film Orphans and Kingdoms which was released for general exhibition in April 2016.

He lives in the Hawkes Bay with his partner Renee Mark and their two children.

Rotondo and Mark run a regular national film festival called Cinema Italiano: The Italian Film Festival.

Directing credits 
Orphans & Kingdoms - Feature Film
The Freezer - Short Film
Dead Letters (Adaptation)

Writing credits

Film 

 The Freezer (2003) - Short Film

Dead Letters (Adaptation) (2006)

Orphans & Kingdoms (2014) - Feature Film

Theatre 
 Little Che
 Strange Resting Places (co-written with Rob Mokaraka) 
Black Hands

Acting

Television
Xena: Warrior Princess: Philius
Cleopatra 2525: Porter
The Insiders Guide to Happiness: Tim
Serial Killers: As: Bevan
Shortland Street: As: Andrew Solomon
When we go to war (2015) As: Alonso Moretti. Director Pete Burger
Cancerman: Milan Brych
Street Legal
Jackson's Wharf
Perfectly Frank - The Life of a NZ Writer
The Call Up
The Strip
Spin Doctors
Riverworld
The Luminaries (2020) As: Aubert Gascoigne

Theatre
Tartuffe: Tartuffe - Silo Theatre
The Agony and Ecstasy of Steve Jobs: Performer for Silo Theatre
Little Dog Laughed Silo Theatre
Black Hands: Writer/Actor/Producer
Little Che: Writer/Actor/Producer
Strange Resting Places: Writer/Actor - Taki Rua Productions
Peer Gynt Narrator for Auckland Philharmonia
Mr. Marmalade: Bradley - Auckland Theatre Company
Twelfth Night: Sebastian - Auckland Theatre Company
Fond Love and Kisses: Rob - Downstage Theatre
The Butchers' Daughter: Emilian & Others
A Streetcar Named Desire: Pablo Gonzales - Auckland Theatre Company
Dog - Silo Theatre
NeverNever - BATS
The Young Baron Biaggio - Maidment Theatre
Accidental Death of an Anarchist: Madman - Maidment Theatre
Coriolanus: Brutus - Maidment Theatre
Nowhere Fast: Bevan - Maidment Theatre
Round About Thursday: Roger - Maidment Theatre

Film
The Ugly: Simon Cartwright
Young Hercules: Enya
Stickmen: Thomas
Riverworld: Flavius

Voice-over
Power Rangers Mystic Force: Snow Prince
Power Rangers Dino Charge: Duplicon
Path of Exile: Daresso

Awards

 Rome Fantastic Film Festival Fantafestival (1997) Best Actor: for The Ugly
 Air New Zealand Screen Awards (2006) Best Script - Short Film: for Dead Letters
 Chapman Tripp Theatre Awards (2007) - Winner - Best New Playwright - Strange Resting Places
 Chapman Tripp Theatre Awards (2007) - Nomination - Production Of The Year - Strange Resting Places
 Museum and New Zealand Society of Authors Research grant (2015)
 TV Guide Best on the Box People's Choice - Best Actor - Milan Brych - Cancerman
 TV Guide Best on the Box People's Choice Nomination - Best Actor - The Insiders Guide to Happiness

Shakespeare Globe International Artistic Fellowship
New Zealand Italian Film Scholarship (organised by Tony Lambert)

References

External links

NZ Listener- Upfront: Paolo Rotondo
 http://orphansandkingdoms.com
http://www.flyingfish.co.nz/paolo-rotondo/
http://www.johnsonlaird.com/our-actors/Paolo_Rotondo

New Zealand male film actors
New Zealand male television actors
New Zealand male voice actors
New Zealand male soap opera actors
1970s births
Living people
Italian emigrants to New Zealand
New Zealand people of Italian descent
21st-century New Zealand male actors
New Zealand theatre people
New Zealand writers
New Zealand film directors
Italian people of New Zealand descent